Ethmia omega is a moth in the family Depressariidae. It is found in Brazil.

The ground color of the forewings is whitish, heavily interspersed with brownish gray scales, appearing more or less uniform speckled gray. The markings are blackish brown. The ground color of the hindwings is white, becoming brownish along the costal and the distal margins.

References

Moths described in 1973
omega